The National is a 52-story,  skyscraper in the Main Street district of downtown Dallas, Texas, adjacent to the Dallas Area Rapid Transit (DART) Akard Station. It is the tenth tallest building in the city. In January 2010 the building was closed due to low occupancy rates. It was listed on the National Register of Historic Places in 2017. 

In 2020, it reopened, after the most costly building conversion in Dallas' history, totaling $460 million. It contains The luxury Thompson Dallas Hotel, 324 apartments, 37,000 sq ft of office space and 43,000 sq ft of retail space.

History
The $35 million skyscraper was designed for the First National Bank in Dallas by architects George Dahl and Thomas E. Stanley, built to replace First National's home on Main Street. It originally was proposed to be  higher, but was scaled back after determining it would be a hazard to flights leaving Dallas Love Field. By choosing a site with lower elevation, the tower, even with a modified height, was still taller than rival bank's Republic Center. The  block of land previously contained First National's motor bank, which was demolished for the new structure. The building's construction began in 1961 and used more than 25,000 tons of steel. At the time of opening in 1965, it was the tallest building west of the Mississippi River, until surpassed by 555 California Street in San Francisco in 1969. It was the tallest in Texas until 1971, when One Shell Plaza was built in Houston. In 1974, Renaissance Tower became the tallest in Dallas.

Floors 11-49 were general lease space not used by First National Bank. The white columns running up the tower contain Plexiglas mullions that house fluorescent lights, which were once turned on every night. The Observation Terrace on the 50th floor contained the world's highest escalator from the 49th floor.

At ground level the building features a long pedestrian arcade flanked by retail space connected Elm Street and Pacific Street, and the building was later connected to the Dallas Pedestrian Network when the adjacent Renaissance Tower was opened in 1974. An 800-space garage was located on the lower two levels, and was the largest single parking facility in Dallas at the time.

During following years the bank continued to grow and under InterFirst Corp. built Renaissance Tower and Bank of America Plaza. After a series of mergers it became part of Bank of America, and as most banking operations vacated the structure the name was changed to Elm Place. Under a special agreement, the bank owned the bottom 10 floors, while the lobby and upper 42 floors had a separate owner. The lower floors of the building were foreclosed on in early 2009; the tower portion of the building closed in late January 2010 due to low occupancy rates. In May 2010 the building was put up for sale for $19 million.

In 2020, it reopened, after the most costly building conversion in Dallas' history, totaling $460 million. It contains The luxury Thompson Dallas Hotel, 324 apartments, 37,000 sq ft of office space and 43,000 sq ft of retail space.

Banking facilities
The building's eight story base, which contained the banking and operational function for First National Bank, covered the entire block and featured a continuous set of  marble arches on all sides of the building. The lower five floors of the base were recessed  to provide large walkways around the building. The floors above the arches (6,7 and 8) do not have any windows and are covered in marble.

The  main banking floor, located on the 4th floor, was 2 stories in height and contained the vaults and 50 teller stations. Two motor banks served customers: a "walk-up" bank on Elm Street for pedestrians and a "drive-in" bank on Pacific Street.

The second floor contained the "Money Tree", a  mural designed by Alma Shon made of 8,500 coins and carved wood.

The ninth floor, the first floor of the tower, housed the bank's top executives, lounge areas and executive dining room. It was surrounded by an extensive rooftop garden, heavily landscaped and filled with sculptures and fountains. The 8th floor contained the Dallas Room, a 300-seat auditorium, and the bank employees' cafeteria.

Gallery

See also
National Register of Historic Places listings in Dallas County, Texas
List of tallest buildings in Dallas
List of tallest buildings in Texas

References

External links

The National official website
The National Residences official website
Thompson Dallas Hotel official website
The National official corporate website

Office buildings completed in 1965
Skyscraper office buildings in Dallas
National Register of Historic Places in Dallas
Bank buildings on the National Register of Historic Places in Texas